The House of Romanov (also transcribed Romanoff) was the reigning imperial house of Russia from 1613 to 1917. They achieved prominence after the Tsarina, Anastasia Romanova, was married to the First Tsar of Russia, Ivan the Terrible. Czar Nicholas II's immediate family was executed in 1918, but there are still living descendants'.

The house became boyars (the highest rank in Russian nobility) of the Grand Duchy of Moscow and later of the Tsardom of Russia under the reigning Rurik dynasty, which became extinct upon the death of Tsar Feodor I in 1598. The Time of Troubles, caused by the resulting succession crisis, saw several pretenders and imposters (False Dmitris) fight for the crown during the Polish–Muscovite War of 1605–1618. On 21 February 1613, a Zemsky Sobor elected Michael Romanov as Tsar of Russia, establishing the Romanovs as Russia's second reigning dynasty. Michael's grandson Peter I, who established the Russian Empire in 1721, transformed the country into a great power through a series of wars and reforms. The direct male line of the Romanovs ended when Empress Elizabeth of Russia died childless in 1762. As a result, her nephew Peter III, an agnatic member of the  House of Holstein-Gottorp (a cadet branch of the German House of Oldenburg that reigned in Denmark), ascended to the throne and adopted his Romanov mother’s house name. Officially known as members of the House of Romanov, descendants after Elizabeth are sometimes referred to as "Holstein-Gottorp-Romanov". In 1918, Bolshevik officials executed the ex-Emperor and his family. Of the House of Romanov's 65 members, 47 survivors went into exile abroad.

In 1924, Grand Duke Kirill Vladimirovich, the senior surviving male-line descendant of Alexander II of Russia by primogeniture, claimed the headship of the defunct Imperial House of Russia. Since 1991, the succession to the former Russian throne has been in dispute.

Surname usage
Legally, it remains unclear whether any ukase ever abolished the surname of Michael Romanov (or of his subsequent male-line descendants) after his accession to the Russian throne in 1613, although by tradition members of reigning dynasties seldom use surnames, being known instead by dynastic titles ("Tsarevich Ivan Alexeevich", "Grand Duke Nikolai Nikolaevich", etc.). From , the monarchs of the Russian Empire claimed the throne as relatives of Grand Duchess Anna Petrovna of Russia (1708–1728), who had married Charles Frederick, Duke of Holstein-Gottorp. Thus they were no longer Romanovs by patrilineage, belonging instead to the Holstein-Gottorp cadet branch of the German House of Oldenburg that reigned in Denmark. The 1944 edition of the Almanach de Gotha records the name of Russia's ruling dynasty from the time of Peter III (reigned 1761–1762) as "Holstein-Gottorp-Romanov". However, the terms "Romanov" and "House of Romanov" often occurred in official references to the Russian imperial family. The coat-of-arms of the Romanov boyars was included in legislation on the imperial dynasty,
and in a 1913 jubilee, Russia officially celebrated the "300th Anniversary of the Romanovs' rule".

After the February Revolution of March 1917, a special decree of the Provisional Government of Russia granted all members of the imperial family the surname "Romanov". The only exceptions, the morganatic descendants of the Grand Duke Dmitri Pavlovich (1891–1942), took (in exile) the surname Ilyinsky.

Origins to 18th century

The Romanovs share their origin with two dozen other Russian noble families. Their earliest common ancestor is one Andrei Kobyla, attested around 1347 as a boyar in the service of Semyon I of Moscow. Later generations assigned to Kobyla an illustrious pedigree. An 18th-century genealogy claimed that he was the son of the Old Prussian prince Glanda Kambila, who came to Russia in the second half of the 13th century, fleeing the invading Germans. Indeed, one of the leaders of the Old Prussian rebellion of 1260–1274 against the Teutonic order was named Glande. This legendary version of the Romanov's origin is contested by another version of their descent from a boyar family from Novgorod.

His actual origin may have been less spectacular. Not only is Kobyla Russian for "mare", some of his relatives also had as nicknames the terms for horses and other domestic animals, thus suggesting descent from one of the royal equerries. One of Kobyla's sons, Feodor, a member of the boyar Duma of Dmitri Donskoi, was nicknamed Koshka ("cat"). His descendants took the surname Koshkin, then changed it to Zakharin, which family later split into two branches: Zakharin-Yakovlev and Zakharin-Yuriev. During the reign of Ivan the Terrible, the former family became known as Yakovlev (Alexander Herzen among them), whereas grandchildren of  changed their name to "Romanov".

Feodor Nikitich Romanov was descended from the Rurik dynasty through the female line. His mother, Evdokiya Gorbataya-Shuyskaya, was a Rurikid princess from the Shuysky branch, daughter of Alexander Gorbatyi-Shuisky.

Rise to power
The family fortunes soared when Roman's daughter, Anastasia Zakharyina, married Ivan IV (the Terrible), the Rurikid Grand Prince of Moscow, on 3 (13) February 1547. Since her husband had assumed the title of tsar, which literally means "Caesar", on 16 January 1547, she was crowned the very first tsaritsa of Russia. Her mysterious death in 1560 changed Ivan's character for the worse. Suspecting the boyars of having poisoned his beloved, Tsar Ivan started a reign of terror against them. Among his children by Anastasia, the elder (Ivan) was murdered by the tsar in a quarrel; the younger Feodor, a pious but lethargic prince, inherited the throne upon his father's death in 1584.

Throughout Feodor's reign (1584–1598), the Tsar's brother-in-law, Boris Godunov, and his Romanov cousins contested the de facto rule of Russia. Upon the death of childless Feodor, the 700-year-old line of Rurikids came to an end. After a long struggle, the party of Boris Godunov prevailed over the Romanovs, and the Zemsky sobor  elected Godunov as tsar in 1598. Godunov's revenge on the Romanovs was terrible: all the family and its relations were deported to remote corners of the Russian North and Urals, where most of them died of hunger or in chains. The family's leader, Feodor Nikitich Romanov, was exiled to the Antoniev Siysky Monastery and forced to take monastic vows with the name Filaret.

The Romanovs' fortunes again changed dramatically with the fall of the Godunov dynasty in June 1605. As a former leader of the anti-Godunov party and cousin of the last legitimate tsar, Filaret Romanov's recognition was sought by several impostors who attempted to claim the Rurikid legacy and throne during the Time of Troubles. False Dmitriy I made him a metropolitan, and False Dmitriy II raised him to the dignity of patriarch. Upon the expulsion of the Polish army from Moscow in 1612, the Zemsky Sobor offered the Russian crown to several Rurikid and Gediminian princes, but all declined the honour.

On being offered the Russian crown, Filaret's 16-year-old son Mikhail Romanov, then living at the Ipatiev Monastery of Kostroma, burst into tears of fear and despair. He was finally persuaded to accept the throne by his mother Kseniya Ivanovna Shestova, who blessed him with the holy image of Our Lady of St. Theodore. Feeling how insecure his throne was, Mikhail attempted to emphasize his ties with the last Rurikid tsars and sought advice from the Zemsky Sobor on every important issue. This strategy proved successful. The early Romanovs were generally accepted by the population as in-laws of Ivan the Terrible and viewed as innocent martyrs of Godunov's wrath.

Dynastic crisis

Mikhail was succeeded by his only son Alexei, who steered the country quietly through numerous troubles. Upon Alexei's death, there was a period of dynastic struggle between his children by his first wife Maria Ilyinichna Miloslavskaya (Feodor III, Sofia Alexeyevna, Ivan V) and his son by his second wife Nataliya Kyrillovna Naryshkina, the future Peter the Great. Peter ruled from 1682 until his death in 1725. In numerous successful wars he expanded the tsardom into a huge empire that became a major European power. He led a cultural revolution that replaced some of the traditionalist and medieval social and political system with a modern, scientific, Europe-oriented, and rationalist system.

New dynastic struggles followed the death of Peter. His only son to survive into adulthood, Tsarevich Alexei, did not support Peter's modernization of Russia. He had previously been arrested and died in prison shortly thereafter. Near the end of his life, Peter managed to alter the succession tradition of male heirs, allowing him to choose his heir. Power then passed into the hands of his second wife, Empress Catherine, who ruled until her death in 1727. Peter II, the son of Tsarevich Alexei, took the throne but died in 1730, ending the Romanov male line. He was succeeded by Anna I, daughter of Peter the Great's half-brother and co-ruler, Ivan V. Before she died in 1740 the empress declared that her grandnephew, Ivan VI, should succeed her. This was an attempt to secure the line of her father, while excluding descendants of Peter the Great from inheriting the throne. Ivan VI was only a one-year-old infant at the time of his succession to the throne, and his parents, Grand Duchess Anna Leopoldovna and Duke Anthony Ulrich of Brunswick, the ruling regent, were detested for their German counselors and relations. As a consequence, shortly after Empress Anna's death, Elizabeth Petrovna, a legitimized daughter of Peter I, managed to gain the favor of the populace and dethroned Ivan VI in a coup d'état, supported by the Preobrazhensky Regiment and the ambassadors of France and Sweden. Ivan VI and his parents died in prison many years later.

House of Holstein-Gottorp-Romanov

The Holstein-Gottorps of Russia retained the Romanov surname, emphasizing their matrilineal descent from Peter the Great, through Anna Petrovna (Peter I's elder daughter by his second wife). In 1742, Empress Elizabeth of Russia brought Anna's son, her nephew Peter of Holstein-Gottorp, to St. Petersburg and proclaimed him her heir. In time, she married him off to a German princess, Sophia of Anhalt-Zerbst. In 1762, shortly after the death of Empress Elizabeth, Sophia, who had taken the Russian name Catherine upon her marriage, overthrew her unpopular husband, with the aid of her lover, Grigory Orlov. She reigned as Catherine the Great. Catherine's son, Paul I, who succeeded his mother in 1796, was particularly proud to be a great-grandson of Peter the Great, although his mother's memoirs arguably insinuate that Paul's natural father was, in fact, her lover Sergei Saltykov, rather than her husband, Peter. Painfully aware of the hazards resulting from battles of succession, Paul decreed house laws for the Romanovs – the so-called Pauline Laws, among the strictest in Europe – which established semi-Salic primogeniture as the rule of succession to the throne, requiring Orthodox faith for the monarch and dynasts, and for the consorts of the monarchs and their near heirs. Later, Alexander I, responding to the 1820 morganatic marriage of his brother and heir, added the requirement that consorts of all Russian dynasts in the male line had to be of equal birth (i.e., born to a royal or sovereign dynasty).

Age of Autocracy
Paul I was murdered in his palace in Saint Petersburg in 1801. Alexander, I succeeded him on the throne and later died without leaving a son. His brother, crowned Nicholas I, succeeded him on the throne in 1825. The succession was far from smooth, however, as hundreds of troops took the oath of allegiance to Nicholas's elder brother, Constantine Pavlovich who, unbeknownst to them, had renounced his claim to the throne in 1822, following his marriage. The confusion, combined with opposition to Nicholas' accession, led to the Decembrist revolt. Nicholas I fathered four sons, educating them for the prospect of ruling Russia and for military careers, from whom the last branches of the dynasty descended.

Alexander II, son of Nicholas I, became the next Russian emperor in 1855, in the midst of the Crimean War. While Alexander considered it his charge to maintain peace in Europe and Russia, he believed only a strong Russian military could keep the peace. By developing the army, giving some freedom to Finland, and freeing the serfs in 1861 he gained much popular support for the reign.

Despite his popularity, however, his family life began to unravel by the mid-1860s. In 1864, his eldest son, and heir, Tsarevich Nicholas, died suddenly. His wife, Empress Maria Alexandrovna, who suffered from tuberculosis, spent much of her time abroad. Alexander eventually turned to a mistress, Princess Catherine Dolgoruki. Immediately following the death of his wife in 1880 he contracted a morganatic marriage with Dolgoruki. His legitimization of their children, and rumors that he was contemplating crowning his new wife as empress, caused tension within the dynasty. In particular, the grand duchesses were scandalized at the prospect of deferring to a woman who had borne Alexander several children during his wife's lifetime. Before Princess Catherine could be elevated in rank, however, on 13 March 1881 Alexander was assassinated by a hand-made bomb hurled by Ignacy Hryniewiecki. Slavic patriotism, cultural revival, and Panslavist ideas grew in importance in the latter half of this century, evoking expectations of a more Russian than cosmopolitan dynasty. Several marriages were contracted with members of other reigning Slavic or Orthodox dynasties (Greece, Montenegro, Serbia). In the early 20th century two Romanov princesses were allowed to marry Russian high noblemen – whereas, until the 1850s, practically all marriages had been with German princelings.

His son Alexander III succeeded Alexander II. This tsar, the second-to-last Romanov emperor, was responsible for conservative reforms in Russia. Not expected to inherit the throne, he was educated in matters of state only after the death of his older brother, Nicholas. Lack of diplomatic training may have influenced his politics as well as those of his son, Nicholas II. Alexander III was physically impressive, being not only tall (1.93 m or 6'4", according to some sources), but of large physique and considerable strength. His beard hearkened back to the likeness of tsars of old, contributing to an aura of brusque authority, awe-inspiring to some, alienating to others. Alexander, fearful of the fate which had befallen his father, strengthened autocratic rule in Russia. Some of the reforms the more liberal Alexander II had pushed through were reversed.

Alexander had inherited not only his dead brother's position as Tsesarevich, but also his brother's Danish fiancée, Princess Dagmar. Taking the name Maria Fyodorovna upon her conversion to Orthodoxy, she was the daughter of King Christian IX and the sister of the future kings Frederik VIII of Denmark and George I of Greece, as well as of Britain's Queen Alexandra, consort of Edward VII. Despite contrasting natures and backgrounds, the marriage was considered harmonious, producing six children and acquiring for Alexander the reputation of being the first tsar not known to take mistresses.

His eldest son, Nicholas, became emperor upon Alexander III's death due to kidney disease at age 49 in November 1894. Nicholas reputedly said, "I am not ready to be tsar...." Just a week after the funeral, Nicholas married his fiancée, Alix of Hesse-Darmstadt, a favorite grandchild of Queen Victoria of the United Kingdom. Though a kind-hearted man, he tended to leave intact his father's harsh policies. For her part the shy Alix, who took the name Alexandra Fyodorovna, became a devout convert to Orthodoxy as well as a devoted wife to Nicholas and mother to their five children, yet avoided many of the social duties traditional for Russia's tsarinas. Seen as distant and severe, unfavorable comparisons were drawn between her and her popular mother-in-law, Maria Fyodorovna. When, in September 1915, Nicholas took command of the army at the front lines during World War I, Alexandra sought to influence him toward an authoritarian approach in government affairs even more than she had done during peacetime. His well-known devotion to her injured both his and the dynasty's reputation during World War I, due to both her German origin and her unique relationship with Rasputin, whose role in the life of her only son was not widely known. Alexandra was a carrier of the gene for haemophilia, inherited from her maternal grandmother, Queen Victoria. Her son, Alexei, the long-awaited heir to the throne, inherited the disease and suffered agonizing bouts of protracted bleeding, the pain of which was sometimes partially alleviated by Rasputin's ministrations. Nicholas and Alexandra also had four daughters: the Grand Duchesses Olga, Tatiana, Maria and Anastasia.

The six crowned representatives of the Holstein-Gottorp-Romanov line were: Paul (1796–1801), Alexander I (1801–1825), Nicholas I (1825–1855), Alexander II (1855–1881), Alexander III (1881–1894), and Nicholas II (1894–1917).

Constantine Pavlovich and Michael Alexandrovich, both morganatically married, are occasionally counted among Russia's emperors by historians who observe that the Russian monarchy did not legally permit interregnums. But neither was crowned and both actively declined the throne.

 Gallery 

Downfall

The February Revolution of 1917 resulted in the abdication of Nicholas II in favor of his brother Grand Duke Michael Alexandrovich. The latter declined to accept imperial authority save to delegate it to the Provisional Government pending a future democratic referendum, effectively terminating the Romanov dynasty's rule over Russia.

After the February Revolution, Nicholas II and his family were placed under house arrest in the Alexander Palace. While several members of the imperial family managed to stay on good terms with the Provisional Government and were eventually able to leave Russia, Nicholas II and his family were sent into exile in the Siberian town of Tobolsk by Alexander Kerensky in August 1917. In the October Revolution of 1917 the Bolsheviks ousted the Provisional government. In April 1918, the Romanovs were moved to the Russian town of Yekaterinburg, in the Urals, where they were placed in the Ipatiev House. Here on the night of 16–17 July 1918, the entire Russian Imperial Romanov family along with several of their retainers were executed by Bolshevik revolutionaries, most likely on the orders of Vladimir Lenin.

Contemporary Romanovs
 

There have been numerous post-Revolution reports of Romanov survivors and unsubstantiated claims by individuals to be members of the deposed Tsar Nicholas II's family, the best known of whom was Anna Anderson. Proven research has, however, confirmed that all of the Romanovs held prisoners inside the Ipatiev House in Ekaterinburg were killed.

Grand Duke Kirill Vladimirovich, a male-line grandson of Tsar Alexander II, claimed the headship of the deposed Imperial House of Russia, and assumed, as pretender, the title "Emperor and Autocrat of all the Russias" in 1924 when the evidence appeared conclusive that all Romanovs higher in the line of succession had been killed.  Kirill was followed by his only son Vladimir Kirillovich. Vladimir's only child, Maria Vladimirovna (born 1953), claims to have succeeded her father. The only child of her marriage with Prince Franz Wilhelm of Prussia, George Mikhailovich, is her heir apparent. 

The Romanov Family Association (RFA) formed in 1979, a private organization of most living male-line descendants of Emperor Paul I of Russia (other than Maria Vladimirovna and her son), publicly acknowledges that dynastic claims of family members should not be advanced, and is officially committed to support which ever form of government chosen by the Russian people.

Execution of Tsar and family

Late on the night of 16 July, Nicholas, Alexandra, their five children and four servants were ordered to dress quickly and go down to the cellar of the house in which they were being held. There, the family and servants were arranged in two rows for a photograph they were told was being taken to quell rumors that they had escaped. Suddenly, a dozen armed men burst into the room and gunned down the imperial family in a hail of gunfire. Those who were still breathing when the smoke cleared were stabbed to death.

The remains of Nicholas, Alexandra and three of their children were excavated in a forest near Yekaterinburg in 1991 and positively identified two years later using DNA analysis. The Crown Prince Alexei and one Romanov daughter were not accounted for, fueling the persistent legend that Anastasia, the youngest Romanov daughter, had survived the execution of her family. Of the several "Anastasias" that surfaced in Europe in the decade after the Russian Revolution, Anna Anderson, who died in the United States in 1984, was the most convincing. In 1994, however, scientists used DNA to prove that Anna Anderson was not the tsar's daughter but a Polish woman named Franziska Schanzkowska.

Initially, gunmen shot at Nicholas who immediately fell dead as a result of multiple bullet wounds. Then the dark room where the family was held filled with smoke and dust from the spray of bullets. With limited visibility, the gunmen shot blindly, often hitting the ceiling and walls, creating more dust and debris. As a result of this many of the gunmen themselves became injured. Alexandra was soon shot in the head by military commissar Peter Ermakov and was killed. It was not until after the room had been cleared of smoke that the shooters re-entered to find the remaining Imperial family still alive and uninjured. Maria attempted to escape through the doors at the rear of the room, leading to a storage area, but the doors were nailed shut. The noise produced as she rattled the doors attracted the attention of Ermakov. Some of the family were shot in the head, but several of the others, including the young and frail Tsarevich, would not die either from multiple close-range bullet wounds or bayonet stabs. The gunmen then proceeded to shoot each family member once again. Even so, two of the daughters were still alive 10 minutes later, and were then bludgeoned with the butt of a rifle ending their lives. Later it was discovered that the bullets and bayonet stabs had been partially blocked by diamonds sewn into the children's clothing.

Following the murder of the Romanov family, the Bolsheviks made several attempts to dispose of the bodies. Initially the bodies were to be thrown down a mineshaft, however the location of the disposal site was revealed to locals causing them to change the location. Instead of a burial, the Bolsheviks decided to burn two of the corpses of the former royal family. Burning the corpses proved to be difficult as it took significant time so the group resorted to disfiguring the pair with acid. In a rush, the Bolsheviks threw nine additional bodies into a grave and covered them with acid as well.

The bodies of the Romanovs were then hidden and moved several times before being interred in an unmarked pit where they remained until the summer of 1979 when amateur enthusiasts disinterred and re-buried some of them, and then decided to conceal the find until the fall of communism. In 1991 the grave site was excavated and the bodies were given a state funeral under the nascent democracy of post-Soviet Russia, and several years later DNA and other forensic evidence was used by Russian and international scientists to make accurate identifications.

The Ipatiev House has the same name as the Ipatiev Monastery in Kostroma, where Mikhail Romanov had been offered the Russian Crown in 1613. The large memorial church "on the blood" has been built on the spot where the Ipatiev House once stood.

Nicholas II and his family were proclaimed passion-bearers by the Russian Orthodox Church in 2000. In Orthodoxy, a passion-bearer is a saint who was not killed because of his faith, like a martyr; but who died in'' faith at the hand of murderers.

Remains of the Tsar

In the mid-1970’s, Dr. Alexander Avdonin discovered the mass grave containing the remains of Nicholas II, Alexandra Feodorovna, and three of five Romanov children. The remains were found near Old Koptyaki road in Ekaterinburg, Russia. The grave contained 44 heavily degraded bone and tooth fragments. Avdonin released his discovery following the collapse of the Soviet Union in 1991 prompting investigation by the Russian government.

The area where the remains were found was near the old Koptyaki Road, under what appeared to be double bonfire sites about 70 meters (230 ft) from the mass grave in Pigs Meadow near Ekaterinburg. The archaeologists stated that the bones were from a boy who approximately between the ages of 10 and 13 years at the time of his death and of a young woman who was between the ages of 18 and 23 years old. At the time, Anastasia was 17 years old while Maria was 19 years. Their brother Alexei would have been 14 within two weeks of his murder. Alexei's elder sisters Olga and Tatiana were 22 and 21 years old at the time of the murder respectively. The bones were found using metal detectors and metal rods as probes. Also, striped material was found that appeared to have been from a blue-and-white striped cloth; Alexei commonly wore a blue-and-white striped undershirt.

In mid-2007, a Russian archaeologist announced a discovery by one of his workers. The excavation uncovered the following items in the two pits which formed a "T":
 remains of 44 human bone fragments;
 bullet jackets from short barrel guns/pistols;
 wooden boxes which had deteriorated into fragments;
 pieces of ceramic which appear to be amphoras which were used as containers for acid;
 iron nails;
 iron angles;
 seven fragments of teeth;
 fragment of fabric of a garment.
Geneticists used a combination of autosomal STR and mtDNA sequencing to detect relationships between the family members' remains. Using a DNA sample from Prince Phillip, Duke of Edinburgh, a distant cousin of Alexandra, scientists matched his DNA to her and her children’s remains found in the mass grave. The investigation concluded that Alexei and one Romanov daughter were missing. Experts continue to debate which daughter was missing from the grave as United States experts believe the missing child is Anastasia while Russian experts believe it to be Maria. Many believe that the two children that were not discovered in the grave managed to escape Russia before persecution.

As for Nicholas II, scientists used mtDNA heteroplasmy using samples from Princes Xenia Cheremeteff Sfiri and the Duke of Fife. In the early 1990’s, considerable controversy surrounded the accuracy of mtDNA heteroplasmy for DNA testing particularly for distant relatives. In an attempt to refine the results of the investigation, Russian authorities exhumed the remains of Nicholas II’s brother, George Alexandrovich. George’s remains matched the heteroplasmy of the remains found in the grave indicating that they did in fact belong to Tsar Nicholas II.

After the bodies were exhumed in June 1991, they remained in laboratories until 1998, while there was a debate as to whether they should be reburied in Yekaterinburg or St. Petersburg. A commission eventually chose St. Petersburg. The remains were transferred with full military honor guard and accompanied by members of the Romanov family from Ekaterinburg to St. Petersburg. In St. Petersburg remains of the imperial family were moved by a formal military honor guard cortege from the airport to St Petersburg’s Saint Peter and Paul Cathedral where they (along with several loyal servants who were killed with them) were interred in a special chapel in the Peter and Paul Cathedral near the tombs of their ancestors. At the Cathedral, the remaining Romanov family hosted a formal funeral for Tsar Nicholas II attended by many relatives and representatives from nations worldwide.

Killing of other Romanovs
On 18 July 1918, the day after the killing at Yekaterinburg of the tsar and his family, members of the extended Russian imperial family met a brutal death by being killed near Alapayevsk by Bolsheviks. They included: Grand Duke Sergei Mikhailovich of Russia, Prince Ioann Konstantinovich of Russia, Prince Konstantin Konstantinovich of Russia, Prince Igor Konstantinovich of Russia and Prince Vladimir Pavlovich Paley, Grand Duke Sergei's secretary Varvara Yakovleva, and Grand Duchess Elisabeth Fyodorovna, a granddaughter of Queen Victoria and elder sister of Tsarina Alexandra. Following the 1905 assassination of her husband, Grand Duke Sergei Alexandrovich, Elisabeth Fyodorovna had ceased living as a member of the Imperial family and took up life as a serving nun, but was nonetheless arrested and slated for death with other Romanovs. They were thrown down a mine shaft into which explosives were then dropped, all being left to die there slowly.

The bodies were recovered from the mine by the White Army in 1918, who arrived too late to rescue them. Their remains were placed in coffins and moved around Russia during struggles between the White and the opposing Red Army.  By 1920 the coffins were interred in a former Russian mission in Beijing, now beneath a parking area.  In 1981 Grand Duchess Elisabeth was canonized by the Russian Orthodox Church Outside of Russia, and in 1992 by the Moscow Patriarchate.  In 2006 representatives of the Romanov family were making plans to re-inter the remains elsewhere. The town became a place of pilgrimage to the memory of Elisabeth Fyodorovna, whose remains were eventually re-interred in Jerusalem.

On 13 June 1918, Bolshevik revolutionary authorities killed Grand Duke Michael Alexandrovich of Russia and Nicholas Johnson (Michael's secretary) in Perm.

The exiled Grand Duke Nicholas Konstantinovich of Russia died on 26 January 1918, with some rumors claiming he was killed by the Bolsheviks. His morganatic son Prince Artemy Nikolayevich Romanovsky-Iskander was killed the following year in the Russian Civil War.

In January 1919 revolutionary authorities killed Grand Dukes Dmitry Konstantinovich, Nikolai Mikhailovich, Paul Alexandrovich and George Mikhailovich, who had been held in the prison of the Saint Peter and Paul Fortress in Petrograd.

Exiles

Dowager Empress Maria Fyodorovna
In 1919, Maria Fyodorovna, widow of Alexander III, and mother of Nicholas II, managed to escape Russia aboard , which her nephew, King George V of the United Kingdom, had sent to rescue her, at the urging of his own mother, Queen Alexandra, who was Maria's elder sister. After a stay in England with Queen Alexandra, she returned to her native Denmark, first living at Amalienborg Palace, with her nephew, King Christian X, and later, at Villa Hvidøre. Upon her death in 1928 her coffin was placed in the crypt of Roskilde Cathedral, the burial site of members of the Danish Royal Family.

In 2005 the coffin with her remains was moved to the Sts. Peter and Paul Fortress, to be buried beside that of her husband. The transfer of her remains was accompanied by an elaborate ceremony at Saint Isaac's Cathedral officiated by the Patriarch Alexis II. Descendants and relatives of the Dowager Empress attended, including her great-grandson Prince Michael Andreevich, Princess Catherine Ioannovna of Russia, the last living member of the Imperial Family born before the fall of the dynasty, and Prince Dmitri and Prince Nicholas Romanov.

Other exiles
Among the other exiles who managed to leave Russia were Maria Fyodorovna's two daughters, the Grand Duchesses Xenia Alexandrovna and Olga Alexandrovna, with their husbands, Grand Duke Alexander Mikhailovich and Nikolai Kulikovsky, respectively, and their children, as well as the spouses of Xenia's elder two children and her granddaughter. Xenia remained in England, following her mother's return to Denmark, although after their mother's death Olga moved to Canada with her husband, both sisters dying in 1960. Grand Duchess Maria Pavlovna, widow of Nicholas II's uncle, Grand Duke Vladimir, and her children the Grand Dukes Kiril, Boris and Andrei, and Kiril’s wife Victoria Melita and children, also managed to flee Russia. Grand Duke Dmitri Pavlovich, a cousin of Nicholas II, had been exiled to the Caucasus in 1916 for his part in the murder of Grigori Rasputin, and managed to escape Russia. Grand Duke Nicholas Nikolaievich, who had commanded Russian troops during World War I prior to Nicholas II taking command, along with his brother, Grand Duke Peter, and their wives, Grand Duchesses Anastasia and Militza, who were sisters, and Peter's children, son-in-law, and granddaughter also fled the country.

Elizaveta Mavrikievna, widow of Konstantin Konstantinovich, escaped with her daughter Vera Konstantinovna and her son Georgii Konstantinovich, as well as her grandson Prince Vsevolod Ivanovich and her granddaughter Princess Catherine Ivanovna to Sweden. Her other daughter, Tatiana Konstantinovna, also escaped with her children Natasha and Teymuraz, as well as her uncle's aide-de-camp Alexander Korochenzov. They fled to Romania and then Switzerland. Gavriil Konstantinovich was imprisoned before fleeing to Paris.

Ioann Konstantinovich's wife, Elena Petrovna, was imprisoned in Alapayevsk and Perm, before escaping to Sweden and Nice, France.

Olga Constantinovna of Russia, Dowager Queen of Greece, who had returned to Russia in her widowhood, was able to escape to Switzerland with the help of the Danish embassy.

Pretenders
Since 1991, the succession to the former Russian throne has been in dispute, largely due to disagreements over the validity of dynasts' marriages.

Grand Duchess Maria Vladimirovna of Russia claims to hold the title of empress in pretense with her only child, George Mikhailovich from the House of Hohenzollern, as heir apparent.

Others have argued in support of the rights of the late Prince Nicholas Romanov, whose brother Prince Dimitri Romanov was the next male heir of his branch after whom it was passed to Prince Andrew Romanov and then to his son Prince Alexis Romanoff. 
 
In 2014, a micronation calling itself the Imperial Throne, founded in 2011 by Monarchist Party leader Anton Bakov, announced Prince Karl Emich of Leiningen, a Romanov descendant that still originated from Maria's branch, as its sovereign. In 2017, it renamed itself as "Romanov Empire".

Branches of the Romanov

The Russian Imperial Family was split into four main branches named after the sons of Emperor Nicholas I:

The Alexandrovichi (descendants of Emperor Alexander II of Russia) (with further subdivisions named The Vladimirovichi and The Pavlovichi after two of Alexander II’s younger sons)
The Konstantinovichi (descendants of  Grand Duke Constantine Nicholaevich of Russia)
The Nikolaevichi (descendants of Grand Duke Nicholas Nikolaevich of Russia) 
The Mikhailovichi (descendants of Grand Duke Michael Nicolaevich of Russia)

Alexandrovichi Branch
The Alexandrovichi last male-line members are represented by descendants of Paul Ilyinsky (son Grand Duke Dmitri Pavlovich of Russia) and natural son of Alexander II, Prince George Alexandrovich Yuryevsky. However both lines are unable to press their claim to the defunct Russian throne because of their morganatic status.

Alexandrovichi line is thus claimed to be represented by Grand Duchess Maria Vladimirovna of Russia with her only child, George Mikhailovich from the House of Hohenzollern. The Grand Duchess claim to the throne is based on a claim that all male lines of Romanov are either extinct, illegitimate, or morganatic. Thus triggering semi-salic succession, as the closest female to the last dynast.

Konstantinovichi Branch
This branch could be considered the worst affected branch from the World War I and the Russian Civil War.

From Konstantin's four sons, two died of natural causes prior to the war while two died in the civil war, Grand Duke Nicholas Konstantinovich of Russia from pneumonia caused by lack of medical care, while Grand Duke Dmitry Konstantinovich of Russia was executed along three other Romanovs by firing squad at the walls of Peter and Paul Fortress.

Grand Duke Nicholas himself had two sons, one of whom died in Tashkent fighting in the anti-Bolshevik uprising, while the other son escaped through the way of Persia, leaving behind his son and daughter, Kirill and Natalia who were later adopted into the Androsov family. Kirll and Natalia were the only two Romanov descendants in the male line in the USSR after the Russian Revolution; the rest either fled or were killed. They died without any descendants.

Konstantin other son, Grand Duke Konstantin Konstantinovich of Russia, had 6 sons and 2 daughters. His fourth son, Prince Oleg died in battle in 1914. Three of his sons Prince John, Prince Constantine and Prince Igor Constantinovich of Russia, along with their cousin Vladimir Paley, were murdered in a mineshaft near Alapayevsk on 19 July 1918. Two other sons managed to escape but didn't leave a descendant.

Only five male members were left in 1920, with the youngest born in 1917. No new member was born since then. Thus this branch died out with the death of Prince Kirill Romanovsky-Iskander in 1992.

Nikolavevichi Branch

The legitimate male line of this branch is extinct with the death of Prince Dimitri Romanov in 2016. The male line of this branch however is survived by the illegitimate Nikolayev family, descendant of Grand Duke Nicholas Nikolaevich of Russia (1831–1891) to his mistress Catherine Chislova.

Mikhailovichi Branch

This branch was descended from Grand Duke Michael Nicolaevich of Russia. The last common ancestor of the surviving male line of this branch was Grand Duke Alexander Mikhailovich of Russia. The Grand Duke had 6 sons, Andrei, Feodor, Nikita, Dmitri, Rostislav, and Vasili.
 Prince Andrei Alexandrovich of Russia, his male line is represented only by Prince Andrew Romanoff's three sons, As they were born between 1959 and 1969, and has no male descendant, the headship of this branch would likely pass to a descendant of Prince Rostislav
 Feodor, his male line died out, only survived by his great-granddaughter, Tatiana Alexandra (b. 1986), whose status was illegitimate.
 Prince Nikita Alexandrovich of Russia, his line died out with his descendant, Prince Fedor Nikitich Romanoff, suicide on 25 August 2007
 Prince Dmitri Alexandrovich of Russia, only had a daughter
 Prince Rostislav Alexandrovich of Russia, he had two sons. From his first son, there are three members of the House of Romanov, born in 1985, 1987, and 2013. While from his second, there are three members, born in 1968, 1972, and 2009.
 Prince Vasili Alexandrovich of Russia, only had a daughter

Thus this branch only has 9 male line members left.

Romanov family jewelry

The collection of jewels and jewelry collected by the Romanov family during their reign are commonly referred to as the "Russian Crown Jewels" and they include official state regalia as well as personal pieces of jewelry worn by Romanov rulers and their family. After the Tsar was deposed and his family murdered, their jewels and jewelry became the property of the new Soviet government. A select number of pieces from the collection were sold at auction by Christie's in London in March 1927. The remaining collection is on view today in the Kremlin Armoury in Moscow.

On 28 August 2009, a Swedish public news outlet reported that a collection of over 60 jewel-covered cigarette cases and cufflinks owned by Grand Duchess Vladimir had been found in the archives of the Swedish Ministry for Foreign Affairs, and was returned to the descendants of Grand Duchess Vladimir. The jewelry was allegedly turned over to the Swedish embassy in St. Petersburg in November 1918 by Duchess Marie of Mecklenburg-Schwerin to keep it safe. The value of the jewelry has been estimated at 20 million Swedish krona (about 2.6 million US dollars).

Heraldry

Smaller coat of arms (elements)

The centerpiece is the coat of arms of Moscow that contains the iconic Saint George the Dragon-slayer with a blue cape (cloak) attacking golden serpent on red field.

The wings of double-headed eagle contain coat of arms of following lands:
Right wing

 Tsardom of Kazan, the coat of arms of Kazan that contains black crowned Zilant with red tongue, wings and tail on white field.

 Tsardom of Poland, the coat of arms of Poland that contains a crowned white eagle on a red field.

 Tsardom of Tauric Chersoneses, the coat of arms of Byzantine Crimea that contains black crowned double-headed eagle on golden field, which has a smaller coat of arms with triple crossbeam cross on blue field.

 Grand Duchies of Kiev, Vladimir, and Novgorod, the combined coat of arms of three grand duchies:
 Grand Duchy of Kiev, the coat of arms of Kiev that contains armed archangel (archistrategos) Michael in white on blue field.
 Grand Duchy of Vladimir, the coat of arms of Vladimir that contains golden crowned leopard holding a cross on red field.
 Republic of Novgorod, the coat of arms of Novgorod that contains two black bears holding onto a throne on which crossed stand scepter and cross located under triple candlestick (trikirion) on silver field and two silver fishes on blue field.

Left wing

 Tsardom of Astrakhan, the coat of arms of Astrakhan that contains five arches golden crown over silver scimitar on blue field.

 Tsardom of Siberia, the coat of arms of Siberia that contains two black sables who hold a crown and a red bow with two crossed arrows pointed down on ermine field.

 Tsardom of Georgia, the Coat of arms of Georgia that also contains the Saint George the Dragon-slayer with a red cape (cloak) attacking green serpent on golden field.

 Grand Duchy of Finland, the coat of arms of Finland that contains golden crowned lion holding straight sword and curved sabre on red field with roses.

Family tree

See also
 Romanov impostors
 Ancestors of Nicholas II of Russia
 List of monarchs of Russia
 List of Grand Duchesses of Russia
 List of Grand Dukes of Russia
 List of films about the Romanovs
 The Romanovs Collect: European Art from the Hermitage (exhibition)

Notes

References

Further reading
 Bibliography of Russian history (1613–1917)

External links

 Historical reconstruction series "Romanovs" – First Channel, Star Media, Babich Design (2013).
 The Russian Imperial Collection at the Library of Congress has books from the Romanov family.
 Romanov Collection. General Collection. Beinecke Rare Book and Manuscript Library, Yale University.

|-

|-

|-

|-

|-

|-

|-

 
Tsardom of Russia